Daniel Corcino (born August 26, 1990) is a Dominican professional baseball pitcher for the Lexington Legends of the Atlantic League of Professional Baseball. He has played in Major League Baseball (MLB) for the Cincinnati Reds and the Los Angeles Dodgers. He also played in the Chinese Professional Baseball League (CPBL) for the Wei Chuan Dragons.

Professional career

Cincinnati Reds
Corcino was signed by the Cincinnati Reds as an amateur free agent on January 11, 2008, and began his career in the Dominican Summer League, pitching in 23 games to a 6–2 record and 5.29 ERA in 34 innings. He converted to a starter in 2010, splitting that season between the Single A and Double A levels. 2011 was Corcino's first full season as a starter. He pitched  innings with a 3.42 ERA. Prior to the 2012 season, Keith Law of ESPN.com rated Corcino in the top 100 prospects in baseball. On June 17, 2012, Corcino along with Wilkin De La Rosa, threw the first no-hitter in the history of the Reds' Double A team, the Pensacola Blue Wahoos. He was added to the 40-man roster on November 20, 2012. In the 2013 season at Triple A, Corcino threw 129 innings, recording a 5.86 ERA.

Corcino was called up to the Reds for the first time on August 22, 2014. The Reds optioned Corcino back to AAA on August 28, 2014, two days after he made his Major League debut, throwing a scoreless ninth inning in a 3–0 loss to the Chicago Cubs. He finished the season with a 4.34 ERA in five games. Corcino was designated for assignment by the Reds on April 13, 2015.

Los Angeles Dodgers
Corcino was claimed off waivers by the Los Angeles Dodgers on April 17, 2015 and then designated for assignment by them on April 22. He appeared in only three games in the Dodgers system that season, two as a starter, for the Double-A Tulsa Drillers before spending the rest of the season on the disabled list. He returned to Tulsa for 2016 and managed to stay healthy for the entire season. He appeared in 27 games with a 4.04 ERA and 31 strikeouts.

Chicago Cubs
On December 13, 2016, Corcino signed a minor league contract with the Chicago Cubs. He was released on April 22, 2017.

Second stint with Dodgers
On May 9, 2017, Corcino signed a minor league deal with the Los Angeles Dodgers.  He appeared in four games for Tulsa and 14 games for Rancho Cucamonga. He was assigned to AAA Oklahoma City Dodgers for the 2018 season and had his contract purchased by the Los Angeles Dodgers on June 9, when he was called back up to the majors. He allowed one earned run in four innings over two games with the Dodgers before returning to the minors. He was designated for assignment on July 4. He remained in the minors the rest of the season, making 19 starts out of 28 total appearances with a 3.41 ERA. In 2019, he pitched in 24 games (21 starts for Oklahoma City), with a 8–8 record and 4.90 ERA. Corcino was released by the Dodgers organization on June 30, 2020.

Wei Chuan Dragons
On February 16, 2021, Corcino signed with the Mariachis de Guadalajara of the Mexican League. However, on May 29, Corcino agreed to terms on a contract with the Wei Chuan Dragons of the Chinese Professional Baseball League. He was not re-signed for the 2022 season and became a free agent.

Lexington Legends
On April 20, 2022, Corcino signed with the Lexington Legends of the Atlantic League of Professional Baseball.

References

External links

1990 births
Living people
Billings Mustangs players
Cincinnati Reds players
Dayton Dragons players
Dominican Republic expatriate baseball players in the United States
Dominican Republic expatriate baseball players in Taiwan
Dominican Summer League Reds players
Gulf Coast Reds players
Leones del Escogido players
Los Angeles Dodgers players
Louisville Bats players
Major League Baseball pitchers
Major League Baseball players from the Dominican Republic
Oklahoma City Dodgers players
Pensacola Blue Wahoos players
People from Azua Province
Rancho Cucamonga Quakes players
Tennessee Smokies players
Tigres del Licey players
Tulsa Drillers players
Wei Chuan Dragons players